Jessica Sergis (born 15 September 1997) is an Australian international rugby league footballer who plays for the Sydney Roosters in the NRL Women's Premiership and the Wests Tigers in the NSWRL Women's Premiership.

Career
In 2016, Sergis began playing for Cronulla-Caringbah Sharks.

In 2017, she debuted in the New South Wales 22-6 win over the Queensland women's rugby league team, scoring 3 tries on the wing.

In 2018, she played 3 matches in the Women's rugby league Premiership playing for the St. George Illawarra Dragons at centre.

On 8 June 2019, Sergis was named in the squad to represent New South Wales in the 2019 Women's State of Origin match. On 14 June, she extended her stay with the St. George Illawarra Dragons for the 2019 NRLW season. On 21 June, she scored one try in the Women's State of Origin match, helping the Blues to fourth-consecutive victory over Queensland. With three tries, a try assist, 21 tackle breaks and an average of 153 metres per match in three appearances in the NRLW regular season, she was named the Dally M NRLW Player of the Year at the 2019 Dally M Awards on 2 October. On 14 October, she was named the first-ever RLPA NRLW Player of the Year at the RLPA Awards.

Honours

Individual 
 Dally M Player of the Year: 2019
 RLPA Player of the Year: 2019

Club

Statistics

NRLW

State of Origin

References

External links
 Jessica Sergis profile on NRL.com
 Jessica Sergis profile on NSWRL.com

Living people
Australian female rugby league players
Australia women's national rugby league team players
Rugby league players from Sydney
Sportswomen from New South Wales
St. George Illawarra Dragons (NRLW) players
Wests Tigers NSWRL Women's Premiership players
Australian people of Greek descent
1997 births